Trinity United Methodist Church may refer to:

 Trinity United Methodist Church (Denver, Colorado), listed on the National Register of Historic Places (NRHP)
 Trinity United Methodist Church (Evansville, Indiana), listed on the NRHP
 Trinity United Methodist Church (Lafayette, Indiana), a contributing structure to the NRHP-listed Centennial Neighborhood District
 Trinity United Methodist Church (Highland Park, Michigan), listed on the NRHP
 Trinity United Methodist Church (Athens, Tennessee), listed on the NRHP
 Trinity United Methodist Church (Franklin, Tennessee), listed on the NRHP
 Trinity United Methodist Church (Nutbush, Tennessee)
 Trinity United Methodist Church (Ellett, Virginia), listed on the NRHP